Bridge No. 5083-Marshall carries Minnesota State Highway 19 over the Redwood River in Marshall, Minnesota, United States. It was built 1931 and is one of two bridges on the historic register in the city. It was listed on the National Register of Historic Places in 1998.

Bridge No. 5083 was completed at a cost of $23,277 in October 1931. This bridge is between a residential neighborhood on the south and the city's main park on the north. The bridge design is two  concrete-girder spans on a concrete substructure. Each railing supports two metal light standards detailed in the Classical Revival Style.

Along with the nearby Bridge No. 5151-Marshall, it was nominated for being a rare surviving example of the ornamental urban highway bridges built in Minnesota before World War II.

References

External links
Minnesota Department of Transportation Bridge Database

Buildings and structures in Lyon County, Minnesota
National Register of Historic Places in Lyon County, Minnesota
Road bridges on the National Register of Historic Places in Minnesota
Concrete bridges in the United States
Girder bridges in the United States